Lorenzo Burroughs Deagle  (June 26, 1858 – December 24, 1936) was an American pitcher in Major League Baseball.

References

External links

1858 births
1936 deaths
Baseball players from New York (state)
Major League Baseball pitchers
Cincinnati Red Stockings (AA) players
19th-century baseball players
Louisville Eclipse players
Lancaster Ironsides players
Cleveland Forest Cities players
Topeka Capitals players
Topeka Golden Giants players